

Riodininae is the largest of the three subfamilies within the metalmark butterfly family, Riodinidae.

Classification 
Riodininae contains the following tribes:
Befrostiini Grishin, 2019
Calydnini Seraphim, Freitas & Kaminski, 2018
Dianesiini Seraphim, Freitas & Kaminski, 2018
Emesidini Seraphim, Freitas & Kaminski, 2018
Eurybiini Reuter, 1896
Helicopini Reuter 1897
Nymphidiini Bates, 1859
Riodinini Grote, 1895
Sertaniini Seraphim, Freitas & Kaminski, 2018
Symmachiini Bates, 1859

References

Further reading
 Glassberg, Jeffrey Butterflies through Binoculars, The West (2001)
 Guppy, Crispin S. and Shepard, Jon H. Butterflies of British Columbia (2001)
 James, David G. and Nunnallee, David Life Histories of Cascadia Butterflies (2011)
 Pelham, Jonathan Catalogue of the Butterflies of the United States and Canada (2008)
 Pyle, Robert Michael The Butterflies of Cascadia (2002)

External links

Pteron Images. In Japanese but with binomial names
 Butterflies and Moths of North America
 Butterflies of America

 
Butterfly subfamilies